is a Japanese manga artist. She made her professional manga debut in 1998. She used to work with Ribon, but now her manga is serialized in Margaret Comics.

Works
 ± Junkie
 Love Luck
 Strange Orange 2006

External links
 Yūya Asahina @ Twitter
 Yūya Asahina's Blog

1980 births
Living people
Manga artists from Aomori Prefecture